The Papua New Guinea women's national under-17 football team is the second highest women's youth team of women's football in Papua New Guinea and is controlled by the Papua New Guinea Football Association.

History
Papua New Guinea have participated all three times so far in the OFC U-17 Women's Championship. They managed to get a second spot twice, in 2012 and 
in 2016. In the first tournament, in 2010, they became third. Georgina Kaikas scored Papua New Guinea's first ever goal in the tournament. She did this on April 12, 2010 in a 4–0 victory against Tonga women's national under-17 football team. She managed to score four goals in total. However, with this number she is not the top goal scorer of the country cause in 2016 Belinda Giada scored seven goals.

OFC
The OFC Women's Under 17 Qualifying Tournament is a tournament held once every two years to decide the only qualification spot for Oceania Football Confederation (OFC) and representatives at the FIFA U-17 World Cup.

Current technical staff

References

External links
Papua New Guinea Football Association page
Oceania Football Federation page

Women's national under-17 association football teams
U